Robert Fifer (born February 2, 1956) is a retired American business consultant, author and speaker. He was the president of Fifer Associates and the author of Double Your Profits in Six Months or Less (HarperCollins, 1993).

Biography
Fifer grew up in New York, graduating from Harvard College in 1977 with a magna cum laude degree in economics, and from Harvard Business School in 1979.

From 1979 to 1982, he was an officer at Strategic Planning Associates, a management consulting firm in Washington, D.C. In 1982, he became the fourth employee to join the management consulting company of Kaiser Associates. Three years later, at the age of 29, Fifer was promoted to chairman and CEO of the company.

In 2000, Fifer sold Kaiser Associates and established Fifer Associates.

Fifer's best-selling book, Double Your Profits in Six Months or Less (1993), became required reading for managers at Fortune 500 companies such as General Electric, Allied Signal, and Citicorp/Travelers. Jack Welch, the former CEO of General Electric, bought 125 copies for senior managers, who placed their own orders for another 2,700 copies.

Fifer lives with his wife in Great Falls, Virginia.

Bibliography

 (with Gordon Quick)

References

External links

"Case Study: Bob Fifer", 9 September 1994
"Becoming an Enlighted CEO" - interview with Bob Fifer on Small Business Podcasts

American business writers
American chief executives
Harvard College alumni
Harvard Business School alumni
1956 births
Living people
People from Great Falls, Virginia